Kazakhstan is competing at the 2013 World Aquatics Championships in Barcelona, Spain between 19 July and 4 August 2013.

Open water swimming

Kazakhstan qualified five quota places for the following events in open water swimming.

Swimming

Kazakhstani swimmers achieved qualifying standards in the following events (up to a maximum of 2 swimmers in each event at the A-standard entry time, and 1 at the B-standard):

Men

Women

Synchronized swimming

Kazakhstan has qualified twelve synchronized swimmers.

Water polo

Men's tournament

Team roster

Nikolay Maksimov
Sergey Gubarev
Yevgeniy Medvedev
Roman Pilipenko
Murat Shakenov
Alexey Shmider
Vladimir Ushakov
Anton Koliadenko
Rustam Ukumanov
Mikhail Ruday
Ravil Manafov
Branko Pekovich
Valeriy Shlemov

Group play

Round of 16

Women's tournament

Team roster

Alexandra Zharkova
Natalya Shepelina
Aizhan Akilbayeva
Anna Turova
Anastassiya Mirshina
Anna Zubkova
Natalya Alexandrova
Yekaterina Glushkova
Assel Jakayeva
Marina Gritsenko
Alexandra Rozhentseva
Assem Mussarova
Kristina Krassikova

Group play

Round of 16

References

External links
Barcelona 2013 Official Site
Swimming Federation of the Republic of Kazakhstan

Nations at the 2013 World Aquatics Championships
2013 in Kazakhstani sport
Kazakhstan at the World Aquatics Championships